The Office of Economic Stabilization was established within the United States Office for Emergency Management on October 3, 1942, pursuant to the Stabilization Act of 1942, as a means to control inflation during World War II through regulations on price, wage, and salary increases.

Directors
 1942-1943 James Byrnes
 1943-1945 Fred M. Vinson
 1945-1946 William H. Davis

See also
 Emergency Price Control Act of 1942
 Office of Price Administration

References

Defunct agencies of the United States government
Agencies of the United States government during World War II
Government agencies established in 1942
1942 establishments in the United States